Romney is an unincorporated community in Eastland County in the U.S. state of Texas.

External links 
 

Unincorporated communities in Eastland County, Texas
Unincorporated communities in Texas